Kaélé is a town in Cameroon's Far North Province, on the Diamaré Plain at . It lies near the Chadian border and 104 km south of Maroua. The town has a population of roughly 30,600 and is the capital of the Mayo Kani division. The cottonseed oil company Diamaor runs a mill in the town. Kaélé is accessible by road and by airstrip.

Notable people
 

Tikela Kemone (born 1950), Cameroonian politician
Marthe Wandou (born 1963), Cameroonian activist

Gallery

References
 Fomensky, R., M. Gwanfogbe, and F. Tsala, editorial advisers (1985) Macmillan School Atlas for Cameroon. Malaysia: Macmillan Education Ltd.
 Ngoh, Victor Julius (1996) History of Cameroon Since 1800. Limbé: Presbook, 1996.

Communes of Far North Region (Cameroon)